Lê Văn Trường (born 25 December 1995) is a Vietnamese footballer who plays as a goalkeeper for V.League 1 club Khánh Hòa.

Honours
Vietnam U19
AFF U-19 Youth Championship: Runner-up 2013, 2014
Hassanal Bolkiah Trophy: Runner-up 2014

External links

References 

1995 births
Living people
Vietnamese footballers
Association football goalkeepers
V.League 1 players
Hoang Anh Gia Lai FC players
People from Vĩnh Phúc province